Relacom is a global supplier of network services. The company constructs, installs, and maintains fixed, mobile, and enterprise networks. Relacom’s business concept is to provide field-managed network services at homes, in offices, and on networks. Relacom offers strategic integrated services to major international companies in northern Europe through more than 250 offices in Sweden, Norway, Finland, and Denmark.

Relacom is headquartered in Solna, Stockholm, Sweden, and is present in 4 countries with approximately 4,100 employees as of 2014.

In April 2019, the company was acquired by the Norwegian industrial group OneCo.

History
Relacom was formerly called Telavie. Altor Equity Partners acquired Norwegian Bravida Telecom (Telavie) at the end of 2004. In May 2005, Altor Equity Partners became the majority owner of Flextronics Network Services. The merger of Flextronics Network Services and Telavie, subsequently renamed Relacom, created a leading Nordic network service provider. Altor was unable to make the new company profitable, and at the end of 2009, Altor along with Nordea, DnB Nor, and German HSH Nordbank invested an additional 400 million SEK in the company. On April 12, 2011, the banks took control of the company from Altor. Since 2011 Relacom is owned by the three banks (Nordea, DnB NOR, and HSH Nordbank).

Services
Relacom is a provider of technology services and provides integrated services in telecommunications, power and M2M "machine-to-machine". Relacom is both a provider of network services to operators and a local partner to businesses, municipalities, electric companies, network owners and consumers. Relacom offers everything from construction of nationwide mobile network and service of electrical and telecommunication networks to install fiber to new residential or to secure communication in workplaces and homes.

Operations
Relacom is an independent company in Relacom Group and does business in Sweden. Within Relacom Group subsidiaries and fellow subsidiaries share key functions such as finance, HR, legal, sales and marketing. Operations within Relacom are divided into three business areas: Telecom, Power Supple, and M2M "machine-to-machine".

The company has business in northern Europe through more than 250 offices in Sweden, Norway, Finland and Denmark.

References

External links
 Relacom (company website)

Internet service providers of Sweden
Private equity portfolio companies
Companies based in Stockholm